The demographics of Lima can be reconstructed through the population censuses carried out throughout its history. The government statistics department estimates that a third of Peru's population lives in Lima.

Population by year

Ethnic groups
Mestizos: 47% 
European: 40%
Asian: 8%
Amerindian: 2%
Afro-Peruvian: 3%

Evolution of the Lima Metropolitan Area

References

Lima
Lima